Brabham is a suburb located about  north-east of Perth's central business district. The suburb is located in the City of Swan just south of Henley Brook, formerly being a part of that suburb before it was gazetted in May 2011. The suburb was named after Australian motor racing personality Sir Jack Brabham who competed in the 1962 Australian Grand Prix, held at the nearby Caversham Airfield. The suburb is part of the City of Swan's urban growth corridor and is bordered by Park Street to the north, Murray Street to the east, Harrow Street to the south and Drumpellier Drive and Isoondon Street to the west. It is located in the Whiteman Ward of the City of Swan.

Caversham Airfield 
Caversham Airfield was constructed by the US military to be used as a base for bomber aircraft during the later stages of World War II. Following the war, the strip was no longer required for aircraft and so it was converted into a racing track, hosting the Australian Grand Prix twice, in 1957 and 1962. In 1969, all WA circuit racing was moved to the newly opened Wanneroo Park Raceway and so the federal government developed the facility into a radio communications hub. The airfield will soon be the site of future housing development by DevelopmentWA in partnership with developer Peet.

City of Swan - Whiteman Ward 
As part of the 2017 City of Swan Boundary review the suburb of Brabham was relocated from the Swan Valley/Gidgegannup Ward into the renamed Whiteman Ward (formerly known as the Ballajura Ward).

The current councillors for the area are:
 Bryce Parry
 Mel Congerton 
 John McNamara

Development 
Development of the suburb commenced in 2011 at the Whiteman Edge estate by Stockland. Other estates include:
Whiteman Edge by Stockland
Ariella Private Estate by Cedar Woods
Avonlee Private Estare by TerraNovis
Flamewood Private Estate by Parcel Property
Brabham by Peet.

The Brabham town centre located on Everglades Avenue is newly established and features a Coles supermarket, 12 speciality retailers, a medical centre and childcare facilities but future development is to be expected.

Education facilities 
Brabham has access to a wide range of primary and secondary schools, both public and private. 

Primary schools include:
Brabham Primary School
Ellenbrook Independent Primary School
St Helena’s Catholic Primary School
Caversham Primary School

Secondary schools include:
 Ellenbrook Secondary College
 Swan Valley Anglican Community School
 Ellenbrook Christian College

References

Suburbs of Perth, Western Australia
2011 establishments in Australia
Suburbs and localities in the City of Swan